An amphibious cycle is a human-powered vehicle capable of operation on both land and water. The design which has received the most coverage is "Saidullah’s Bicycle." The bike uses four rectangular air filled floats for buoyancy which propelled using two fan blades which were attached to the spokes. "Moraga’s Cyclo Amphibious"  uses a simple tricycle frame to support three floaters which provide both the flotation and thrust. The wings on the powered wheels propel the vehicle in a similar way to a paddle wheel.

Another design is the SBK Engineering Shuttle-Bike. It consists of two inflatable floats with straps that allow the carrying of a bicycle by the passenger. The ensemble, when deflated, fits in a backpack for carrying by the cyclist.

Another amphibious vehicle is that of seven engineering students at the University of Southampton. The "Amphibious Cycle" combines a recumbent frame with separate floats, and is propelled using a paddle wheel. A speed test on water achieved an average speed of 1.12 m/s. The cyclist could transition the cycle in and out of the water while unassisted. This prototype has real applications in urban areas of flooding, as well as applications in the leisure industry.

An amphibious vehicle was created by five engineering students at Calvin College as a senior design project (May 2010). This vehicle improves upon previous designs by allowing smooth transition from water to land.

Another recent design was developed by Ebrahim Hemmatnia for his voyage around the world. This velomobile was called the Melanie.

References

External links 
 Saidullah Amphibious Bicycle.
 Amphibious Cycle
 Amphibious Bicycle Concept.
 The DIY Amphibious Bike Rides the Water

Cycle
Cycle types